The Doctor of Audiology (AuD) is a professional degree for an audiologist.  The AuD program is designed to produce audiologists who are skilled in providing diagnostic, rehabilitative, and other services associated with hearing, balance, tinnitus management, and related audiological fields. These individuals help patients with hearing problems primarily by diagnosing hearing loss and fitting hearing assistive devices.
There is an emphasis on the clinical learning experience, though most programs also have a research component.  As of 2007, the AuD has replaced Masters-level audiology programs as the entry-level degree in the United States.  Other countries, such as Australia, Canada and India, still offer the master's degree. In the United States, after an AuD is obtained, some states may require a license before practicing audiology clinically.  The majority of AuD programs include three years of didactic and clinical instruction and a one-year externship, similar to a medical residency. A few schools offer accelerated three-year programs. Programs differ in their prerequisite requirements for admission, though broadly applicants must have some background in the natural and social sciences, mathematics, and humanities. While it may be helpful for applicants to have a background in the communication sciences, this is not generally required for admission to an AuD program.

See also
First professional degree
Hearing test
Audiology
Speech

References

External links
American Academy of Audiology
Audiology Foundation of America
American Board of Audiology
Academy of Doctors of Audiology
American Speech-Language Hearing Association

Audiology, Doctor of
Academic degrees in healthcare